Noxious describes any happening that is perceived as harmful. It may also refer to:

Poison, substances that can harm or kill
Noxious weed, a plant designated by the government as injurious to public health, agriculture, recreation, wildlife or property
Noxious stimulus, an actually or potentially tissue damaging event, may be mechanical, chemical or thermal
Federal Noxious Weed Act of 1974, a United States law that established a federal program to control the spread of noxious weeds